Bae Hyo-sung (born 1 January 1982) is a South Korean former footballer who played as a defender.

Club career
He began his professional career with Busan I'Park in 2004. In February 2011, he moved from Busan to Incheon United as soon as he left the army-based team Gwangju Sangmu. Although being a newly arriving player, coach Huh Jung-moo named him as team captain for 2011 season. On 14 November 2011, he left Incheon for his hometown team Gangwon FC.

Career statistics

References

External links 

1982 births
Living people
South Korean footballers
Association football defenders
Busan IPark players
Incheon United FC players
Gimcheon Sangmu FC players
Gangwon FC players
Gyeongnam FC players
Chungju Hummel FC players
K League 1 players
K League 2 players
People from Taebaek
Sportspeople from Gangwon Province, South Korea